Edward Carrington King (born January 31, 1983) is a retired American professional road racing cyclist who last rode for UCI ProTeam . King turned professional in 2006 and raced for ten years, retiring from contemporary road racing in 2015. He quickly segued to the burgeoning world of gravel cycling, where he has been a pioneer in the world of competitive gravel racing.

Personal
Born in Exeter, New Hampshire, King spent his adolescence in Brentwood, New Hampshire, United States. In 2005, he graduated from Middlebury College in Middlebury, Vermont, United States where he studied economics and mathematics. During his career King resided in both Girona, Catalonia, Spain and Lucca, Italy. Though he shares a surname with several other professional cyclists, in the pro peloton Ted only shares family relation to his older brother Robert "Robbie" King, who was a professional cyclist from 2006 to 2008. King's father, also Ted King, was an orthopaedic surgeon practicing in Exeter for 25 years before suffering a stroke in 2003. The elder King is now a member of the Krempels Center, an organization in Portsmouth, New Hampshire dedicated to improving the lives of those living with brain injury.

In 2011, the two King brothers helped create the King Challenge, an annual benefit bike ride in Stratham, New Hampshire, which as of the ninth edition in 2019 has generated more than one-million dollars for the Krempels Center. Ted is now an ambassador for the general sport of cycling, working with long time sponsors to get more people more excited about riding a bike, racing a bike, and spending time on a bike.

Ted is a co-founder of UnTapped, a sports nutrition founded in Richmond, Vermont based on the nutritional merits of maple syrup. UnTapped sells energy gels, stroopwafels, and hydration drink mix, all using maple syrup and maple sugar as the carbohydrate base.

Career
King is a domestique having raced for Thor Hushovd, Carlos Sastre, and most notably spending four years alongside Peter Sagan.

King was controversially disqualified from the 2013 Tour de France. The disqualification was a result of finishing seven seconds outside the elimination time on Stage 4. King had been involved in a crash on Stage 1 in the lead up to the sprint finale for his teammate Peter Sagan; the crash resulted in a separated shoulder and broken scapula among other injuries for King. He continued on for three more stages before finishing outside that time limit, as a result he was not  able to start the next day.

King rode the 2014 Tour de France, but withdrew on Stage 10 due to injuries he sustained in Stage 1.

He retired from road racing after the 2015 season.

Beginning in early 2016, King quickly became a leader in the sport of gravel cycling. Twice a winner of Dirty Kanza, in 2016 and 2018, he has won or finished on the podium of most of the major gravel races.

Career achievements

Major results
Sources:

2006
 2nd Overall International Tour de Toona
1st  Young rider classification
 6th Overall Fitchburg Longsjo Classic
 6th Univest Grand Prix
2007
 4th Overall Tour de Leelanau
2008
 3rd Overall Fitchburg Longsjo Classic
 3rd Overall Tour de Leelanau
 5th Overall Nature Valley Grand Prix
2011
 3rd National Road Race Championships
2013
 7th National Road Race Championships
2016
 1st Dirty Kanza 200
2018
 1st Dirty Kanza 200
2019
 1st SBTGRVL
 8th Overall Dirty Kanza 200
2021
 4th Unbound Gravel 200

Grand Tour general classification results timeline

References

External links

 
 
 Edward King at Cycling Base
 
 
 Ted King at Cannondale–Garmin
 Ted King at 2019 Garmin Dirty Kanza

1983 births
Living people
People from Exeter, New Hampshire
American male cyclists
Middlebury College alumni
People from Brentwood, New Hampshire
Sportspeople from Rockingham County, New Hampshire
Cyclists from New Hampshire